Nashit ( derived from) was a singer of Persian origin, acquired as a slave by Abd Allah b. Dja'far b. Abi Talib, and who flourished in the second half of the 1st century A.H. in Medina. His Persian style of singing was a great success there, compelling other singers to imitate it, but Nashit himself had to learn the Arab style and songs in order to enlarge his repertoire.

References 

Persian musicians
People from Medina
7th-century Iranian people